The Nokia C6-00 is a smartphone and portable entertainment handheld cellular device by Finnish communications company Nokia, running the Symbian S60v5 operating system. It was announced on April 13, 2010. It is the third Nokia Symbian^1 smartphone featuring a full slide-out QWERTY keyboard. Its software and hardware specifications resemble the N97 mini in most ways. One of the differences is that the sliding in this phone is flat, unlike the upward angled in the N97 mini, hence allowing a four row QWERTY keypad, bringing a slightly enhanced typing experience to the table. The phone has a 5-megapixel camera, though unlike the N97 mini, it does not have Carl Zeiss optics. It also has a secondary camera in front for video calls. The Nokia C6-01 is the successor to the C6-00 featuring a major step-up with the new Symbian^3 operating system, Ovi Maps 3.0 and such but losing the QWERTY keyboard.

All application and games for similar handsets like the N97, the N97 Mini, the 5800 Xpressmusic, and the 5230 will be compatible with this handset.

Reviews

Cnet UK wrote that 'The C6 suffers from the worst excesses of the N97's software, without the saving grace of its solid hardware, resulting in a phone that's disappointing at any price.' Cnet Asia wrote that though the user interface is slow and outdated. However, they like the improved connectivity features, free real-time navigation with Ovi Maps and the generally well-built chassis. 

T3 magazine said that 'This is a decent phone, but unlikely to convert anyone to Symbian, making it a handset for Nokia fans, with the priority of texting and emailing'. while techradar.com gave it three out of five stars and stated that while the phone had useful widgets and a nice screen that those features were countered by general usability frustrations. Stuff.TV also gave the phone three out of five stars and said that the C6 was an 'efficient enough phone' but felt outdated. Electricpig gave the phone two out of five stars and wrote that loved the sturdy nature of the phone and Nseries specifications but that they hated the unresponsive screen and bad button design.

Nokia C6-00 is currently non upgradeable to Symbian Belle Operating system.

References

External links

 Nokia C6
 Nokia C6 Mobile Themes

Videos 
 Nokia C6
 Nokia C6 brings the best messaging together

C600
Mobile phones introduced in 2010
Mobile phones with an integrated hardware keyboard
Mobile phones with user-replaceable battery
Slider phones

hi:नोकिया C6